Bombana Regency (Kabupaten Bombana) is a regency of Southeast Sulawesi Province of Indonesia. It consists of part of the southeast peninsula of Sulawesi, together with most of the substantial offshore island of Kabaena to the south. It covers an area of 3,316.16 km2, and had a population on 139,235 at the 2010 Census and 150,706 at the 2020 Census; the official estimate as at mid 2021 was 151,910. The administrative centre lies at the town of Rumbia.

Administration 
The regency is divided into 22 districts (kecamatan), tabulated below with their areas and their populations at the 2010 Census and the 2020 Census, together with the official estimates as at mid 2021. The table also includes the locations of the district administrative centres, the number of administrative villages (rural desa and urban kelurahan) and offshore islands in each district, and its post code.

Note: (a) notwithstanding the name, this district covers the southwest part of Kabaena island and does not include the south. (b) the southern portion of Kabaena Island (including smaller islands off its southeast coast) forms Talaga Raya District, which is part of Central Buton Regency.

Climate
Most of Bombana Regency has a tropical rainforest climate (Af) with moderate rainfall from August to November and heavy rainfall from December to July. The following climate data is for the town of Rumbia, the seat of the regency.

References

Regencies of Southeast Sulawesi